Te Tau Ihu Māori are a group of Māori iwi in the upper South Island of New Zealand. It includes Ngāti Kuia, Rangitāne, Ngāti Tūmatakōkiri and Ngāti Apa (from the Kurahaupō canoe), Ngāti Koata, Ngāti Rārua and Ngāti Toa (from the Tainui canoe), and
Ngāti Tama and Te Āti Awa (from the Tokomaru canoe of Taranaki).

References